Varsha Raffel (also Varsha Raphael; b. 20 March 1975 in Gorakhpur, Uttar Pradesh) is a One Day International cricketer who represents India. She is a right hand batsman and bowls right-arm off-breaks. She has played nine ODIs, taking eleven wickets including a three-wicket haul.

References

Living people
1975 births
Indian women cricketers
India women One Day International cricketers
Uttar Pradesh women cricketers
Railways women cricketers